Marko Bedenikovic (born June 18, 1984) is a Canadian former soccer player who played as a midfielder and defender.

Playing career

Early career 
Bedenikovic played at the youth level with Dixie Soccer Club. He received a scholarship in 2001 from the University of San Francisco in order to play at the college level for the San Francisco Dons. He played with San Francisco for two seasons. In 2002, he played in the Canadian Professional Soccer League with the Mississauga Olympians. He continued playing in the CPSL when he signed with Toronto Croatia for the 2004 season. The Croats would go on to claim the CPSL Championship by defeating Vaughan Shooters.

He also had several trials throughout Europe with clubs such as Lombard Pápa, Budapest Honvéd, and TuS Koblenz but ultimately wasn't offered a contract. In 2005, he signed with the expansion franchise Oakville Blue Devils. In early September he received another tryout match in France but wasn't offered a contract. He returned for the remainder of the season and assisted in securing a postseason berth for Oakville. In the second round of the playoffs, he contributed the winning goal against Hamilton Thunder that advanced Oakville to the finals. He featured in the championship final and assisted Oakville in securing the title against Vaughan.

Toronto Lynx 
The following season he signed a contract with the Toronto Lynx of the USL First Division. The signing reunited him with former head coach Duncan Wilde. He made his debut on April 22, against Virginia Beach Mariners. He helped Toronto reach the final of the Open Canada Cup but was defeated by Ottawa St. Anthony Italia. In his debut season with the Lynx, he appeared in 27 matches and recorded one goal.

Europe 
In 2008, he also played in a match with the reserve team of Toronto FC. He returned to his former team Toronto Croatia and assisted the Croats in winning the 2007 Croatian World Club Championship. He contributed a goal against Canberra Croatia FC which helped Croatia to claim the title.

In 2009, he played abroad in Hungary's Nemzeti Bajnokság II with Integrál-DAC, where he appeared in seven matches and scored a single goal. Unfortunately, the club ceased operations in late 2009, which resulted in the termination of his contract.

Canada 
After a stint in Europe, he returned to Canada for the 2010 CSL season to sign with Portugal FC. He assisted Portugal in securing a postseason berth and recorded a goal in the playoffs in the second round against Milltown F.C. The following season Portugal FC was renamed SC Toronto and he assisted the club in securing the First Division title.

Bedenikovic would later play in the Ontario Soccer League with HNNK Zagreb in 2012. In 2018, he returned to the Canadian Soccer League to play with CSC Mississauga.

Indoor career 
After the relegation of Toronto to the Premier Development League, he played at the indoor level with Baltimore Blast in the Major Indoor Soccer League. He played in nine matches and recorded two goals for Baltimore.

On December 6, 2018, Bedenikovic and six other players were signed by the Major Arena Soccer League's Florida Tropics SC. The high volume of signings was necessitated by issues with Canadian immigration laws, as the Tropics were due to play the Mississauga MetroStars on December 8. For the remainder of the indoor season, he played in the Mississauga-centered Arena Premier League with Portugal AC.

International career 
Bedenikovic was called to the Canada men's national under-17 soccer team camp in 2001.

Honors

Toronto Croatia
CPSL Championship: 2004
Croatian World Club Championship: 2007

Oakville Blue Devils
CPSL Championship: 2005

References

External links
Marko Bedenikovic USL stats

1984 births
Living people
Baltimore Blast (2001–2008 MISL) players
Canadian expatriate sportspeople in the United States
Canadian expatriate soccer players
Canadian Soccer League (1998–present) players
Canadian soccer players
Canadian people of Croatian descent
Expatriate soccer players in the United States
Association football defenders
Major Indoor Soccer League (2001–2008) players
Brampton United players
Soccer players from Mississauga
Toronto Croatia players
Toronto Lynx players
Toronto (Mississauga) Olympians players
University of San Francisco alumni
USL First Division players
Canadian expatriate sportspeople in Hungary
San Francisco Dons men's soccer players
Canada men's youth international soccer players
SC Toronto players
Integrál-DAC footballers
Nemzeti Bajnokság II players
Florida Tropics SC players
Major Arena Soccer League players
Expatriate footballers in Hungary